There have been various notable predictions made throughout history, including those by scientists based on the scientific method, predictions of social and technological change of futurologists, economic forecasts, religious prophecies, and the fictional imaginings of authors and science fiction. Science fiction author Arthur C. Clarke wrote three laws of prediction.

Economic forecasting

 In 1987, Ravi Batra predicted an economic depression in his best-selling book, The Great Depression of 1990. He subsequently wrote other books on surviving economic upheaval.
 In 1996, economist Alan Greenspan famously stated that there was irrational exuberance in the stock market on Dec 5, 1996, and indeed, may well have contributed to it as a result of his policies as Chairman of the Federal Reserve. His warning went unheeded and the stock market continued to boom in the late 1990s until the stock market downturn of 2000 and 2001, when it became evident that the warning had been correct.
 The Great Recession of 2007, arguably the worst since the Great Depression of the 1930s, was not foreseen by most forecasters. The failure to forecast the "Great Recession " was coupled with the inability to accurately estimate its impact.

Scientific prediction

 The existence of Neptune was predicted through mathematical modelling based on Sir Isaac Newton's Law of gravity.
 Radio waves were predicted by James Clerk Maxwell.
 The advent of a worldwide instantaneous communication system (the internet) was predicted by Nikola Tesla, who invented wireless communication.
 Final anthropic principle - highly contentious prediction bordering on philosophy
 Antimatter was predicted by Paul Dirac on the basis of his formulation of relativistic quantum mechanics.
 The Higgs boson, an elementary particle, was predicted by Peter Higgs based on a theoretical model in 1964, and its existence was confirmed in 2012.

Political prediction
 Unipolarity was predicted by Johann Gottlieb Fichte on the basis of his analysis of the challenge of Napoleon and by K'ang Yu-wei on the basis of the macro-historical trend and global closure.
 In an article written in February 1945 titled "Das Jahr 2000"(The Year 2000) Joseph Goebbels made a series of political predictions about what Europe would look like in the year 2000. He predicted that Germany would be split in two, and separated by an "Iron Curtain". He predicted that Europe would be united, and that the British Empire would collapse and be replaced by the United States.
 In 1888, Otto Von Bismark accurately predicted World War I. "One day the Great European War will come out of some damn foolish thing in the Balkans."
 The Cold War was predicted by Alexis de Tocqueville on the basis of the expansion of Russia and America.
 World Wars were predicted by K'ang Yu-wei and George Vacher de Lapouge on the basis of the macro-historical trend and global closure.
 American unipolarity was predicted by George Vacher de Lapouge on the basis of combination of macro-historical trend, global closure and racial theory and by H. G. Wells on the basis of the development level.
 The dissolution of the USSR was predicted by Emmanuel Todd on the basis of economic and national factors.

Futurism

 Doomsday equation (1960): Heinz von Foerster extrapolated historical population data to predict an infinite human population for 2026.
 Future Shock (1970) by Alvin Toffler considered change moving too fast for humans to cope.
 Engines of Creation (1986) by K. Eric Drexler which involves molecular nanotechnology changing the world, and introduces the grey goo scenario.
 The End of History and the Last Man (1992, by Francis Fukuyama) heralded the arrival of the "end point of mankind's ideological evolution and the universalization of Western liberal democracy as the final form of human government." Its thesis has since been disavowed by its author.
 The Clash of Civilizations by Samuel P. Huntington, published in Foreign Affairs, Volume 72, Number 3, Summer 1993 and later expanded into a book, states "the fundamental source of conflict in this new world will not be primarily ideological or primarily economic. The great divisions among humankind and the dominating source of conflict will be cultural. Nation states will remain the most powerful actors in world affairs, but the principal conflicts of global politics will occur between nations and groups of different civilizations. The clash of civilizations will dominate global politics. The fault lines between civilizations will be the battle lines of the future."
 The Coming Technological Singularity (1993, by Vernor Vinge) - a prediction of imminent acceleration of progress caused by increasing speed of computers and developments in AI.
 Ray Kurzweil is concerned with the idea of the singularity and many more optimistic technological and transhumanist predictions.
 "Why the future doesn't need us" (April 2000) - an essay warning about the dangers of robotics, genetic engineering, and nanotechnology to humanity. The essay has achieved wide exposure because of Bill Joy's prominence.
 Arthur C. Clarke:

 Tomorrow Now: Imagining the Next 50 Years by Bruce Sterling in 2002. A popular science approach on futurology, reflecting technology, politics and culture of the next 50 years.
 Our Final Hour by Martin Rees in 2003. The book presents the notion that the Earth and human survival are in far greater danger from the potential effects of modern technology than is commonly realised; hence the 21st century may be a critical moment in history when humanity's fate is decided. Rees gained controversy, and notoriety, by estimating that the probability of extinction before AD 2100 is around 50%. This is based on the possibility of malign or accidental release of destructive technology and has gained some attention, as he is a well-regarded astronomer.
 Dark Age Ahead by Jane Jacobs in 2004. As it implies the book warns of a pessimistic future, in this case caused by a decay in science, community, and education.

Religious prophecy

 Apocalyptic literature
 Bahá'í prophecies
 Bible prophecy
 Christian messianic prophecies
 Destiny
 Divination
 False prophet
 List of dates predicted for apocalyptic events
 List of messiah claimants
 List of people claimed to be Jesus
 List of prophecies of Joseph Smith
 Postdiction
 Predictions and claims for the Second Coming of Christ
 Prophecy
 Teleology
 Unfulfilled Christian religious predictions
 Unfulfilled Watch Tower Society predictions

Utopias and dystopias

 Marquis de Condorcet published his utopian vision of social progress and the perfectibility of man Esquisse d'un Tableau Historique des Progres de l'Espirit Humain (The Future Progress of the Human Mind) in 1794
 William Godwin published his utopian work Enquiry concerning Political Justice in 1793, with later editions in 1796 and 1798.
 An Essay on the Principle of Population by Thomas Malthus in 1798 started the fears of a Malthusian catastrophe where overpopulation returns people to mere subsistence.
 Looking Backward: 2000-1887 was written by Edward Bellamy in 1888. The novel imagined that by 2000, the United States would be a socialist utopia, with far shorter work weeks for menial laborers and far greater leisure time for all workers. His novel predicted things such as skyscrapers, debit cards, and a device used to hear and view concerts in the home that resembles a modern television.
 The Population Bomb by Paul R. Ehrlich in 1968 predicted disasters due to Neo-Malthusian concerns.
 The Limits to Growth (1972, by Club of Rome) was often erroneously accused of predicting the inevitable exhaustion of natural resources.

Science fiction
 Apocalyptic and post-apocalyptic science fiction - comprehensive listing of humanity's worst fears
 Utopian and dystopian fiction
 Future history - list of common backgrounds created by science-fiction authors for their stories
 Brave New World by Aldous Huxley in 1932 imagined a rigid, yet superficially "happy", dystopia that controls people through a mixture of mind control and biotechnology
 Nineteen Eighty-Four (1948, by George Orwell) - a dystopian book set in Oceania, a totalitarian state that emerged in the Americas and the British Empire. The book extrapolates the reality of contemporary Stalinist Russia and Nazi Germany. The main protagonist is Winston Smith, whose job involves supporting the historical revisionism and propaganda of the political regime. Many original concepts from the book, such as doublethink, thought crime, and newspeak have since entered popular consciousness.
 Foundation series by Isaac Asimov. The new science of psychohistory can simulate history and extrapolate the present into the future.
 The author H.G. Wells wrote several works predicting future scientific advances and often exploring the problems that technology causes humanity. He was especially adept at predicting the future role of airplanes in warfare. His 1901 book, Anticipations imagined trains, cars, sexual freedom, and eugenics. In The World Set Free, published in 1914, he eerily predicted the creation of the atom bomb. His 1933 work, Shape of Things to Come, foresaw the extensive use of aerial bombardment in warfare. This was later adapted into the widely seen and critically important Alexander Korda science fiction film Things to Come.
 Paris in the Twentieth Century is a science fiction novel by Jules Verne written in 1863 that features detailed descriptions of a world of glass skyscrapers, high-speed trains, automobiles, calculators, and a worldwide communications network. It was not published in Verne's lifetime, and was only discovered by his great-grandson in 1989. It was published in 1994.
 Make Room! Make Room! - novel by Harry Harrison that predicted overpopulation in 1999 resulted in an unsuspecting population being sustained through cannibalism. Made into the movie Soylent Green.
 Logan's Run is a novel by William F. Nolan and George Clayton Johnson, published in 1967 and describing a dystopian future society in which the population is kept young by euthanizing everyone who reaches a certain age. This neatly avoids the problem of overpopulation.
 Stand on Zanzibar - John Brunner's 1968 vision of overpopulation in 2010
 Z.P.G.  - 1972 film featuring an overpopulated, very polluted future Earth, whose world government practices Zero Population Growth, executing persons who violate the 30-year ban on procreation
 The Twentieth Century (1882, by Albert Robida) - a book by a French author set in 1952 Paris, with a plethora of illustrations

See also
 End of civilization
 Predictions of Soviet collapse
 Precognition

References

External links
 Famous bad predictions from Things People Said
 The Coming Technological Singularity, presented at VISION-21 Symposium, March 30–31, 1993
 Why the future doesn't need us, Wired, April 2000
 Arthur C. Clarke Offers His Vision of the Future, presented at Worcester Polytechnic Institute, November 30, 2001
 Explore the inventions and ideas of science fiction writers
 Science predictions

Science fiction themes